"Ugly When I Cry" is a song by American grunge band Daddy Issues. It is the second single released by the band. Originally released a non-album single in 2014, it was included in their debut LP, Can We Still Hang, after signing with Infinity Cat Records a year later.

Background
After forming in January 2014, the group had self-released two singles months later: "Pizza Girl" and "Ugly When I Cry".

Reception
After its initial release on Soundcloud, it went viral, garnering over 500,000 views. The song has been praised for its 90s grunge-influenced sound.

References 

2014 singles
2014 songs